The Federal Correctional Complex, Petersburg (FCC Petersburg) is a United States federal prison complex for male inmates in Petersburg, Virginia. It is operated by the Federal Bureau of Prisons, a division of the United States Department of Justice.

The complex consists of two facilities:

 Federal Correctional Institution, Petersburg Low: a low-security facility with an adjacent satellite prison camp for minimum-security inmates.
 Federal Correctional Institution, Petersburg Medium: a medium-security facility.

FCC Petersburg is located 25 miles southeast of Richmond, Virginia, the state capital. It lies in the northwesternmost part of Prince George County, just west of Hopewell, Virginia.

FCC Petersburg is located in Prince George County, 25 miles southeast of Richmond, Virginia, the state capital. It lies just west of the independent city of Hopewell, Virginia.

Facility and programs
FCI Petersburg offers numerous educational opportunities, including a GED Program, English as-a-Second Language, Occupational Education, Post-Secondary Education, Adult Continuing Education, as well as Parenting Classes and Release Preparation. The facility also has a Law Library which compliant inmates may use periodically.

FCI Petersburg is one of several federal prison facilities which offer sex offender treatment programs. The Sex Offender Management Program (SOMP) at FCI Petersburg was established to assist in effectively managing the Bureau of Prisons' population of offenders with sex offense histories. The program consists of assessment/evaluation, treatment, and monitoring/managing components. The assessment/evaluation component of SOMP is non-voluntary because it assists correctional staff in determining whether the inmate is likely to engage in risk relevant behavior while incarcerated. The remaining elements of the program are voluntary.

Notable incidents
In 2008, a joint investigation conducted by the FBI and the Bureau of Prisons found that an inmate at FCI Petersburg, John Leighnor, was coordinating an ongoing identity-theft scheme from the facility. Leighnor was already serving a 7-year-sentence dating from a conviction in 2003 for another identity-theft scheme. Armed with the names of his victims, Leighnor drafted correspondence to be sent by mail to various governmental agencies and other organizations to obtain official documentation for his targets. In connection with each mailing, Leighnor either claimed that he was the person he was victimizing or that he was a lawyer, advocate, or other designated representative for a targeted victim. He requested the victim's personal documentation, such as birth certificates, family information, undergraduate transcripts, enrollment applications, and death certificates. Leighnor directed that all return correspondence be sent to his attention at various addresses, including: "Dept. 14375-077, P.O. Box 1000, Petersburg, Virginia 23804." He concealed the fact that the correspondence would be delivered to him at FCI Petersburg and that "14375-077" was his federal prisoner identification number.

Upon receiving the victim's identifying information, Leighnor planned to obtain passports, birth certificates, driver's licenses, and other identification documents for himself in the victims' names, to be used in traveling and obtaining funds from financial institutions and individuals. Leighnor also possessed documents and made statements to other inmates at FCI Petersburg about his plans to file claims with the Claims Resolution Tribunal (the entity charged with handling claims on Swiss bank accounts believed to have been abandoned by victims of Nazi persecution during World War II), in order to gain control of abandoned funds in the Swiss bank accounts connected to Holocaust victims.

In 2009, Leighnor was sentenced to an additional 8 years in prison for mail fraud and identity theft related to the FCI Petersburg scheme. He was held at the Federal Correctional Institution, Fort Dix, a low-security facility in New Jersey. He was released in 2016 after completing his sentence.

A joint investigation conducted by the FBI and the Department of Justice Inspector General found that a correction officer at FCC Petersburg, Keif Jackson, conspired with inmate Walter Brooks to smuggle heroin inside the facility. In 2008, Brooks recruited Jackson to smuggle heroin to him in the prison. At Brooks' request, Officer Jackson contacted acquaintances of Brooks. He met with them on several occasions to obtain heroin, and smuggled the drugs into the prison. After Brooks was released from FCC Petersburg in 2010, Brooks began supplying heroin to Jackson to smuggle into the prison. Approximately one year later, on Oct. 10, 2011, Jackson was stopped by the police on his way to work. Upon searching his vehicle, officers recovered a package containing heroin.

Jackson entered a guilty plea to conspiracy to distribute heroin in March 2012 and was sentenced to 12 months in prison.

In September 2012, a federal jury convicted Brooks, 57, of conspiracy to provide contraband to inmates, conspiracy to distribute heroin, five counts of providing contraband to inmates, and three counts of use of a communication facility to commit a felony.

On June 18, 2022, four inmates were discovered missing from the FCC Petersburg satellite campus. Authorities notified United States Marshals Service, Federal Bureau of Investigation, and other law enforcement agencies.  The inmates were named as

 Corey Branch, age 41, was serving a sentence for a conviction in the United States District Court for the Eastern District of Virginia for possession with intent to distribute fentanyl and for possessing a firearm as a felon.
 Tavares Lajuane Graham, age 44, was serving a sentence for a conviction in the United States District Court for the Eastern District of North Carolina for possession of cocaine and cocaine base with intent to sell, as well as possession of a firearm in furtherance of a drug trafficking crime. His original residence was Hope Mills, North Carolina
 Lamonte Rashawn Willis, age 30, was serving a sentence for a conviction in the Eastern District of Virginia for possessing and concealing a stolen firearm and possession of a firearm by a convicted felon. His original residence was Suffolk, Virginia.
 Kareem Allen Shaw, age 46, was serving a sentence for a conviction in the United States District Court for the Western District of Virginia for conspiracy to possess with intent to distribute a measurable quantity of heroin. His original residence was Harrisonburg, Virginia.

Notable inmates (current and former)

Medium Security

Minimum Security

See also

List of U.S. federal prisons
Federal Bureau of Prisons
Incarceration in the United States

References

Buildings and structures in Prince George County, Virginia
Petersburg
Prisons in Virginia